Julia Brendler (born 26 February 1975) is a German actress.

Biography 
Born on 26 February 1975 in Schwedt (East Germany, now Brandenburg in Germany), she began acting at the age of 14 years. For the first role in Helmut Dzuibas' film Forbidden Love she received the Hessian film award. Then came the film Dagmar Hirtz Irish drama "Moon Dance" and the film by Rainer Matsutanis Comedy-horror Over My Dead Body. Next year, she starred with Johannes Brandtrup in the production of Max Honert "Hamlet." The next attempt to appear in the English-language movie in the film "In the depths" was more or less successful. Now, Brandler plays roles in German cinema and television.

Filmography

TV films and series
1992: Born in 1999
1994: Eurocops (TV series, episode Three Girls)
1994: Die Kommissarin (television series, episode Jugendsünden)
1994: 1998: Der Fahnder (televisial, various roles, 2 episodes)
1994: Der König (TV series, episode first-class murder)
1994:  (TV series, 4 episodes)
1995: Derrick (TV series, episode Mr. Widanje dreams badly)
1996: The Three (TV Series, episode The Witness of the Prosecution)
1996:  (television series, episode Bombengeschäfte)
1996:  (TV series, 8 episodes)
1996: Deutschlandlied (TV-set)
1996: 2½ minutes
1997: Living in fear
1997: Tatort - Der Tod spielt mit (TV series)
1998: Journey to the night
1998: Young Love - and no one is allowed to know
1999: Heartless
1999: Un prete tra noi (TV series, 2 episodes)
1999: Die Verbrechen des Professor Capellari - On Your Own (TV Series)
1999: Camino de Santiago (TV spin-off)
2001: Das Traumschiff - Bermudas (TV series)
2002: Der kleine Mönch (TV series, episode Blue Star)
2002: The Rosary
2002: Edel & Starck (TV series, episode murder is his hobby)
2003: Der letzte Zeuge (TV series, episode The show goes on)
2003: A banker to fall in love with
2004: Der Ermittler (TV series, episode Ice Cold Murder)
2005: The Pastor II - Heimweh to Hohenau
2006: 30 Something
2006: Großstadtrevier (TV series, episode children's suite)
2006: SOKO Wismar (TV series, episode follow-up bullying)
2007: Deadline – Jede Sekunde zählt (TV series, episode tunnel view)
2007: Tatort - The Trap
2007: SOKO Rhein-Main (TV series, follow-up pals from Cameroon)
2008, 2017: Leipzig Homicide (TV series, various roles, 2 episodes)
2008: Im Namen des Gesetzes (television series, episode The Death Comes Twice)
2009: 
2009, 2014: Cologne P.D. (TV series, various roles, 2 episodes)
2009, 2015: Ein Fall für zwei (Television series, various roles, 2 episodes)
2009: The type, 13 children & me
2010: UFO
2010: Katie Fforde - Feast of the Day (TV series)
2010: All love
2010: Der letzte Bulle (TV Series, Episode One Star Over Essen)
2010: Use in Hamburg - Red as death (TV series)
2011: Der Kriminalist (TV series, episode Dierhagen's legacy)
2011: Nord Nord Mord (TV series)
2011: Inclusion - together different
2011–2012: KRIMI.DE (TV series, 2 episodes)
2012: Some like it happy
2012: A triplet rarely comes alone
2012: Johanna and the Bush Pilot - The way to Africa
2012: Johanna and the Bush Pilot - the legend of the cranes
2012: Desired child
2012, 2015: Stuttgart Homicide (TV series, various roles, 2 episodes)
2013: Bankless!
2014: Löwenzahn (TV series, episode Aftermath - The Great Lot)
2014: Inspector Jury - The Dead in the Pub (TV series)
2014: Four triplets are one too much
2014: A sure-fire plan
2014: Separation in Italian
2015: Ein starkes Team - Best friends (TV series)
2015: Tatort - Borowski and the children of Gaarden
2015: Last track Berlin (TV series, episode succession state property)
2016: Marie Brand and the Shadows of the Past (TV series)
2016: The prosecutor (television series, episode successor heirs and dying)
2016: Heldt (TV series, episode Not to be pledged)
2016: Dr. Klein (TV series, episode family problems)
2017: Next to the track - Your will be done (TV series)
2017: Tatort - Neighbors
2017: Lotta & the seriousness of life
2018: Einmal Sohn, immer Sohn
2018: Our boys
2019: Wilsberg: Minus 196°
2020: Spring (TV Series)
2020: The Chancellery 
2020: Die Chefin
2021: SOKO Potsdam

Films
1989: Forbidden Love
1992: Jana and Jan
1993: Angel without Wings
1994: Moondance
1995: The Flight of the Albatros
1995: Over My Dead Body
1997: Sawdust Tales
2000: Deeply
2007: Wortbrot
2009: 
2012: Shifting the Blame
2016: Welcome to Iceland

Short films
1999: Dolphins
2000: Forgotten Knights
2001: Imagine.
2001: Worm gap
2004: The anniversary
2005: Hamlet
2005: Blackout
2006: Townscape
2006: Memory Effect
2008: Clarification of facts
2009: Edgar
2011: Edeltraud and Theodor
2013: The Wizard
2013: Loona Balloona

References 

1975 births
Living people
People from Schwedt
People from Bezirk Frankfurt
German actresses
20th-century German women